Angus Newton MacKay (15 July 19268 June 2013) was an English actor.

He amassed numerous television credits during his career in programmes such as The Gentle Touch, One Foot in the Grave, Only Fools and Horses, Howards' Way, The Professionals, Steptoe and Son (as the salesman for the water bed), The Sweeney, Minder and Z-Cars.

In Doctor Who he was the first actor to play the character Borusa in the story The Deadly Assassin (1976); and was the Headmaster in the story Mawdryn Undead (1983).

Filmography 
 Nothing But the Best (1964) - Clergyman
 Darling (1965) - Ivor Dawlish (uncredited)
 Morgan – A Suitable Case for Treatment (1966) - Best Man
 Secret Ceremony (1968) - Vicar (uncredited)
 Revenge (1971) - Priest
 Percy (1971) - TV producer
 Quest for Love (1971) - Dr. Rankin
 The Mirror Crack'd (1980) - Coroner (uncredited)
 National Lampoon's European Vacation (1985) - Announcer at Court
 Clockwise (1986) - First Class Passenger 
 Prick Up Your Ears (1987) - RADA Judge
 Bullseye! (1990) - Reverend Simkin
 King Ralph (1991) - Assistant Tailor

References

External links

The diaries Angus Mackay can be found and downloaded here

1926 births
2013 deaths
Male actors from Birmingham, West Midlands
English male film actors
English male television actors